Bina Abramowitz (October 30, 1865 – 1953) was a Yiddish actress.

Biography

Early life 
Bina Fuchs was born on October 30, 1865, in Saratov, Russia. Her father was a cartoonist, soldier and tailor.

Career 
At fourteen, Fuchs joined the chorus of Sigmund Mogulesko’s company in Odessa after auditioning—she went unpaid for four months. She later acted with Naphtali Goldfaden’s troupe, where she had a salary and was typecast as mother characters.

After her marriage to fellow actor Max Abramowitz, who she met while travelling with the troupe, the pair toured Russia. In 1886, she went to the United States with Mogulesko and played with many Yiddish companies, gaining roles in many films produced in America. Her roles included Broken Hearts (1926), a silent film directed by Maurice Schwartz, and the Yiddish-language films The Unfortunate Bride (1932) and Yiskor (1933), as well as roles in Jacob Gordin's plays. In 1927, aged sixty-two, Abramowitz signed a contract to play a leading role at the Yiddish Art Theatre. The Evening Standard described Abramowitz as a "mother of six and grandmother of nine."

Abramowitz died in 1953.

References

External links 

Yiddish theatre performers
1865 births
1953 deaths
Actors from Saratov
Jewish American actresses
20th-century American actresses
American film actresses
19th-century actresses from the Russian Empire
Jewish Russian actors